Anilios vagurima, also known as the Mornington blind snake, is a species of blind snake that is endemic to Australia. The specific epithet vagurima (“wandering cleft”) refers to the diagnostic morphology of the cleft in the nasal scale.

Description
The snake grows to about 32 cm in length. It is long and slender, with the upper body darker than the underside.

Distribution and habitat
The species occurs in the Central Kimberley bioregion of north-west Western Australia. The type locality is Mornington Sanctuary. Habitat is open savanna woodland of Eucalyptus brevifolia, over a sparse cover of shrubs and tussock grasses, on red-brown clay-loam soils with scattered termite mounds.

References

vagurima
Snakes of Australia
Reptiles of Western Australia
Reptiles described in 2019
Taxa named by Ryan J. Ellis